Basarab IV cel Tânăr ("the Young"), also known as Țepeluș ("the little Impaler"), (before 1444 ? – 23 March 1482) son of Basarab II, and grandson of Dan II (1422-1431) was 4 times the voivode of the principality of Wallachia between 1474 and 1482: from Oct to Dec 1474, from Jan 1478 to June 1480, from Nov 1480 to before July 1481, and again from Aug 1481 to July 1482.

This was during an unstable political climate in medieval Wallachia that had another 4 princes ruling for some periods of time in those years.

Reigns 

Basarab IV Țepeluș acceded first to the Wallachian throne in 1474, when with help from Transylvanian voivode Stefan Bathory he overthrew his first cousin Basarab III known as the 'Old'. He was then removed from power within 2 months by Radu III (also called Radu the Handsome), his 2nd cousin, who was brought in by a large Ottoman army who was marching to punish Stephen III of Moldavia.

Following his first rule Basarab IV Țepeluș sought refuge back in the Hungarian territories, where he most likely spent most of his life up to that point. In summer 1476 he is dispatched to Transylvania with Vlad III Țepeș (Țepeș = the Impaler) who was preferred by king Matthias Corvinus and Stephen III for the throne of Wallachia & subsequently moves to Moldavia where he was mentioned at the court of Stephen III. It is with the latter's help that before Jan 1478 Basarab Țepeluș again ousted his cousin Basarab Laiotă and starts his 2nd and longest reign.

In 1479 Basarab IV was forced by Ali Koca Bey to side with Ottomans and take part in the Ottoman campaign against Transylvania, providing some 5,000 Wallachian troops to the campaign, where he faced his arch-rival cousin Basarab who had also been living in Transylvania since his overthrow in 1477. Basarab IV brought approx.: 2,000 infantry to the campaign, and with help from Hungarians defeated the combined forces of Wallachia and the Ottomans at the Battle of Breadfield.

In 1481, the same year Mehmed II died and conflict between his two surviving sons, Bayezid II and Cem erupted into open conflict, Vlad IV, the pious half-brother of Vlad III and Radu III, who until now had shown little interest the throne for himself before now was placed on the throne by Ştefan III., who had invaded Wallachia that June  and routed Basarab IV at Râmnicu Vâlcea.

The 15th century was a very volatile time in Wallachia, with the throne passing first from one then to another of the many Princes and family members of both Branches of the House of Basarab that desired it, and soon enough (i.e. July 1481) Basarab IV was again Voivode of Wallachia, with Ottoman support. Ştefan made a last attempt to secure his influence in Wallachia the next summer. and within the year Basarab lost the throne again. Although Vlad IV was restored, he was soon forced to accept the Sultan's suzerainty.

Death 
Basarab IV was killed during the clashes around Mar-Jul of 1482, perhaps due to a conspiracy led by the boyars of Wallachia. Others however suggest he died in battle by Ștefan III during Ștefan III's invasion that year.

Later on, Neagoe Craiovescu, who had acceded to the throne of Wallachia under the name Neagoe Basarab, claimed that Basarab IV was his father by having had an affair with his mother Neaga, who was then married to grand boyar Pârvu Craiovescu. While the Craiovești clan was close with the Dănești branch of the Wallachian ruling family, the claim is highly questionable but was used later on to support its princely origins.

References

Bibliography
 
 
 
 

 

|-

Rulers of Wallachia
House of Dănești
1482 deaths